A beach ball is an inflatable ball for beach and water games. Their large size and light weight require little effort to propel them.

They became popular in the beach-themed films of the 1960s starring Annette Funicello and Frankie Avalon. These movies include Beach Party, Muscle Beach Party, Beach Blanket Bingo and How to Stuff a Wild Bikini.

Design
They generally have a set of soft plastic panels, with two circular end panels, one with an oral inflation valve, intended to be inflated by lung power or pump. A common design is vertical solid colored stripes alternating with white stripes. There are also other designs, including beach balls in a single solid colour, promotional beach balls with advertisements or company slogans, as globes or as Emojis.

Some manufacturers specify the size of their beach balls (which is often confused with the diameter) as the tip-to-tip length of a deflated ball (approximately half the circumference), or even the length of the panels before they have their ends cut and joined into a beach ball.

Other sizes of beach balls exist, ranging from smaller to larger ones.

The world's largest beach ball was made in London, England on May 30, 2017. It was carried by a barge on River Thames. It was produced by Paramount Pictures to promote the 2017 movie Baywatch. The record was registered by Guinness and the certificates were given to the members of the film's cast.

Uses

Beach ball sports include water polo and volleyball. While they are much less expensive than the balls used in professional sports, they are also much less durable, as most of them are made of soft plastic. Giant beach balls may be tossed between crowd members at concerts, festivals, and sporting events. Many graduates use beach balls as a prank during ceremonies, hitting them around the crowd. They are bounced around crowds at cricket, baseball and football games, but are frequently confiscated and popped by security. Some security personnel at these events might inspect the ball's interior after tearing it, most likely searching for illegal items (e.g. narcotics) that might be transported inside the beach ball. Guards may also do this so that the ball cannot enter the field and obstruct or distract players. This happened in August 1999, in a baseball game between the Cleveland Indians and the Los Angeles Angels, where the distraction caused by a beach ball on the field resulted in the Angels' defeat.

Their light weight and stability make beach balls ideal for trained seals to balance on their noses, which has become an iconic scene. Beach balls are also a popular prop used in swimsuit photography and to promote or represent beach-themed events or locations.

Some more basic uses of beach balls include a game's tool, a toy, or just a decoration in certain events. Another basic use of them is simply for sitting, sizes ranging from 24 inches to 48 inches are commonly used. Some examples regarding to the use of sitting are for seats in certain parties (i.e. birthday parties, pool parties, house parties, etc.), another one is for games like musical chairs as seen in one of The Ellen DeGeneres Show's episode titled "Summertime Blindfolded Musical Chairs!" that was uploaded on YouTube in 2013, or just for casual seats for relaxing. Keep in mind that they are not quite reinforced like exercise balls. Excessive sitting and bouncing can slowly damage the beach ball, which may cause the ball to leak, or even pop. It is also advised to keep an eye on the user's weight to maintain the ball's durability.

See also

Balloon
Inflatable
List of inflatable manufactured goods

References

Balls
Inflatable manufactured goods
American inventions
Bathing